Augustin Senghor is a Senegalese politician. A member of the Rally of the Ecologists of Senegal, he became the mayor of Gorée in 2002, prominently featuring anti-erosion measures in his platform.

Senghor is also the president of the US Gorée football club. In 2009, he was elected as president of the Senegal Football Association. Senghor drew 174 votes, compared to 130 for runner-up El Hadji Malick Gackou, and 26 for third candidate Oumar Diop.

References

Year of birth missing (living people)
Living people
Mayors of places in Senegal
Rally of the Ecologists of Senegal politicians
Members of the CAF Executive Committee